I andlighetens rum is the fourth studio album by Swedish singer-songwriter Sonja Aldén. It was released on 16 October 2013.

Track listing
Ljuset
I denna stund
Kärlekens lov
I den stora sorgens famn
Omkring tiggar'n från Luossa
Om det var Gud
I din himmel
Jag ger dig min morgon (I Give You the Morning)
Bred dina vida vingar
Jag ser
Den gyllene staden
Blott en dag

Charts

Weekly charts

Year-end charts

References

2013 albums
Sonja Aldén albums
Swedish-language albums